EdSurge is an education journalism initiative provided by the International Society for Technology in Education.  EdSurge publishes newsletters and operates databases used by venture capitalists, teachers, school administrators and others. In May 2018, EdSurge was identified by the Brookings Institution as one of the world's 16 leading "innovation spotters" in education. These organizations "are searching the globe to find, highlight, and sometimes support education innovations," Brookings wrote.

Overview
EdSurge was founded in 2011 by Elizabeth Corcoran, a former executive editor of Forbes and a former technology reporter for The Washington Post, by Nick Punt, a former vice president at Inigral, a private social network for higher education, by Matt Bowman, a former Catholic school teacher, and by Agustin Vilaseca. 

As of December 2015, the company had raised $5.6 million in funding from investors including GSV Capital, NewSchools Venture Fund, Reach Capital, Catamount Ventures, 1776.vc, the Omidyar Network, the Women's Venture Capital Fund, LearnCapital. and many angels. EdSurge's initial funding in 2012 was led by The Washington Post Company and NewSchools Venture Fund, along with angel investors including Allen & Company’s Nancy Peretsman and Silicon Valley entrepreneur Judith Estrin.

EdSurge's commentary regularly appears in media outlets such as Fast Company. EdSurge's managing editor, Tony Wan, was named in 2014 to Forbes magazine's "30 Under 30" list, and EdSurge's former senior editor, Mary Jo Madda, was named to the 2016 Forbes list, which highlights top achievers under age 30.

Acquisition by ISTE 
In November 2019, ISTE, a non-profit organization focused on education and technology, acquired EdSurge for an undisclosed amount. EdSurge has operated as a for-profit company, but will become a nonprofit media organization by joining ISTE. EdSurge's shareholders and investors will not receive a return on their investment.

References

Educational technology companies of the United States
Education companies established in 2011
Internet properties established in 2011